Ivan Vaughan (18 June 1942 – 16 August 1993) was a boyhood friend of John Lennon and later a schoolmate of Paul McCartney. He was born in Liverpool on the same day as McCartney and they both commenced school at the Liverpool Institute in September 1953. He played tea-chest bass part-time in Lennon's first band, The Quarrymen, and was responsible for introducing Lennon (then 16) to McCartney at a community event (the Woolton village fête) on 6 July 1957, where The Quarrymen were performing. McCartney, having just turned 15, impressed Lennon by knowing all the lyrics to Eddie Cochran's song "Twenty Flight Rock", and with his guitar playing, Lennon invited McCartney to join the band. The next day, McCartney conveyed through Vaughan that he accepted the offer. This decision led to the formation of the Lennon and McCartney's songwriting partnership and subsequently, as The Beatles, the group went on to achieve worldwide success.

Personal life 
Vaughan studied classics at University College London, married in 1966 and settled down to family life with a son and daughter.

From 1973 to 1983, Vaughan taught Psychology at Homerton College, Cambridge. On grounds of ill health, he had to take early retirement.

Lennon and McCartney never forgot the friend who brought them together. For a time they put Vaughan on the payroll of their Apple company, in charge of a plan that never took off to set up a school with a Sixties, hippie-style education ethos. Vaughan's wife Jan, a language teacher, helped McCartney with the French lyrics to the Beatles 1965 song "Michelle".

Autobiographic and documentary 
In 1977, Vaughan was diagnosed with Parkinson's disease. His book, Ivan: Living with Parkinson’s Disease, was published in 1986. He featured in a 1984 BBC documentary, produced  by Patrick Uden and hosted by Jonathan Miller, about his search for a cure. He died in 1993 of pneumonia.

Vaughan's death touched Paul McCartney so deeply that he began to write poetry for the first time since he was a child. He wrote the poem "Ivan" about him after his death, which was published in McCartney's 2001 book Blackbird Singing.

References

1942 births
1993 deaths
Alumni of University College London
Deaths from pneumonia in England
English autobiographers
Musicians from Liverpool
People from Woolton
People with Parkinson's disease
The Quarrymen members
Schoolteachers from Merseyside
Skiffle musicians
Fellows of Homerton College, Cambridge